The 1987 Wisconsin–Stevens Point Pointers represented the University of Wisconsin–Stevens Point as a member of the Wisconsin State University Conference (WSUC) during the 1987 NAIA Division II football season. Led by sixth-year head coach D. J. LeRoy, the Pointers finished the season with an overall record of 12–2–1 and a mark of 7–1 in conference play, winning the WSUC title.

In May 1988, Wisconsin–Stevens Point forfeited their twelve wins, one tie, and both the WSUC and NAIA titles because of the use of two ineligible players, wide receiver Aatron Kenney, and fullback Keith Majors. Both natives of Dallas, Kenney and Majors had each attended Cisco Junior College in Cisco, Texas for two years and then Angelo State University in San Angelo, Texas during the 1986–87 academic year, before transferring to Wisconsin–Stevens Point. An internal investigation conducted by Wisconsin–Stevens Point revealed that both players had improperly altered college transcripts and had violated National Association of Intercollegiate Athletics (NAIA) eligibility rules. LeRoy was fired by Wisconsin–Stevens Point on May 11, 1988, and was succeeded as head coach by John Miech, who had served as the team's defensive coordinator under LeRoy.

Schedule

Roster

References

Wisconsin–Stevens Point
Wisconsin–Stevens Point Pointers football seasons
College football winless seasons
Wisconsin–Stevens Point Pointers football